Whale Hill is an area of Eston in Redcar and Cleveland of North Yorkshire, England, lying at the foot of the Eston Hills. It is within Teesside built-up area's Borough of Middlesbrough sub-division.

The neighbourhood has a population of around 1,500 people, with a mix of age groups living in private and social housing. It also benefits from a local private members' club.

History 

With the rapid growth of all the local villages and towns, the area of Whale Hill was built between 1966 and 1970. The 1970s-built local community centre is a helping hand for the community. Local money has helped make the area and wider Eston's appearance, including the local roundabout  upgraded with a centrepiece of three whales swimming together with large flower bed around them. They have also raised money to build a large community park.

In March 2012 the area had new shops built and an extension to the park and gardens. The purpose-built community centre also had a make-over.

Transport 
Whale Hill is served well by a local bus service, to the towns of Middlesbrough and Redcar. Arriva North East run services to the local towns, and also outlying towns such as Guisborough, and Saltburn. There are six bus stops in the area.

See also
Nunthorpe
Grangetown, North Yorkshire

Redcar and Cleveland